The Journal of Sexual Aggression is a peer-reviewed academic journal It provides an international and interdisciplinary forum for the dissemination of original research findings, reviews, theory, and practice developments regarding sexual aggression in all its forms. The Journal aims to engage readers from a wide range of research, practice and policy areas, including prevention science, crime science, public health, law and regulation, policing and investigation, prosecution and sentencing, corrections and youth justice, child protection, victim advocacy and support, clinical and risk assessment, and offender treatment and risk management. The Journal recognises that human sexual aggression is a global problem, and therefore includes high quality contributions, written in English, from around the world. It is the official journal of the National Organisation for the Treatment of Abusers (NOTA). The Editor-in-Chief of the journal as of 2021 is Dr Nadine McKillop.

Abstracting and indexing 
The journal is abstracted and indexed in Applied Social Sciences Index and Abstracts, CINAHL, Criminal Justice Abstracts, Family Studies Database, International Bibliography of the Social Sciences, PsycINFO, and PASCAL.

References

External links 
 
 National Organisation for the Treatment of Abusers

Sexology journals
Criminology journals
Triannual journals
Taylor & Francis academic journals
English-language journals
Publications established in 1994